A (pseudo-)Riemannian manifold is conformally flat if each point has a neighborhood that can be mapped to flat space by a conformal transformation.

More formally, let  be a pseudo-Riemannian manifold.

Examples
Every manifold with constant sectional curvature is conformally flat.
Every 2-dimensional pseudo-Riemannian manifold is conformally flat.
 The line element of the two dimensional spherical coordinates, like the one used in the geographic coordinate system,
 , has metric tensor  and is not flat but with the stereographic projection can be mapped to a flat space using the conformal factor , where  is the distance from the origin of the flat space, obtaining
.
A 3-dimensional pseudo-Riemannian manifold is conformally flat if and only if the Cotton tensor vanishes.
An n-dimensional pseudo-Riemannian manifold for n ≥ 4 is conformally flat if and only if the Weyl tensor vanishes.
Every compact, simply connected, conformally Euclidean Riemannian manifold is conformally equivalent to the round sphere.
 The stereographic projection provides a coordinate system for the sphere in which conformal flatness is explicit, as the metric is proportional to the flat one.
In general relativity conformally flat manifolds can often be used, for example to describe Friedmann–Lemaître–Robertson–Walker metric. However it was also shown that there are no conformally flat slices of the Kerr spacetime.
 For example, the Kruskal-Szekeres coordinates have line element
   with metric tensor  and so is not flat. But with the transformations  and  
becomes
   with metric tensor ,
 which is the flat metric times the conformal factor .

See also 
 Weyl–Schouten theorem
 conformal geometry
 Yamabe problem

References

Conformal geometry
Riemannian geometry
Manifolds